Sorgenfri (without sadness) may refer to
Sorgenfri, a suburb of Copenhagen, Denmark
Sorgenfri station, a railway station there
Sorgenfri Palace, a palace in Denmark
Sorgenfri (Trondheim), a district in Trondheim, Norway
Sorgenfri (Tromsø), a district in Tromsø, Norway
Sorgenfri, settlement on Saint Thomas, U.S. Virgin Islands.
Sorgenfri (novel), a crime novel by Jo Nesbø
Sorgenfri (magazine), a street magazine in Trondheim, Norway
 Sorgenfri is a neighbourhood of Malmö, Sweden, divided into the western, eastern and industrial parts.